Ernest Mallet (June 10, 1863 – December 5, 1956) was a regent of the Bank of France and a member of the Anglo-French Financial Commission during World War I.

Biography
He was born on June 10, 1863, in the 8th arrondissement of Paris.  He married in London on May 28, 1905, Mabil St-Aubyn.
 
In 1915, he was part of the Anglo-French Financial Commission, which negotiated a $500 million loan for France and Britain from the United States.

He died on December 5, 1956 in the 16th arrondissement of Paris.

References

1863 births
1956 deaths
French bankers
Regents of the Banque de France